Emerling-Gase Motorsports (formerly Joey Gase Racing) is an American stock car racing team that competes in the NASCAR Xfinity Series. The team was founded in November 2021 with NASCAR owner-driver Joey Gase, then called Joey Gase Racing. In December 2021, it was announced that NASCAR Whelen Modified Tour driver Patrick Emerling had partnered with the team, and that the team would be renamed to Emerling-Gase Motorsports. The team fields the No. 35 and 53 full-time in the NASCAR Xfinity Series, along with the No. 53 part-time in the ARCA Menards Series.

Xfinity Series

Car No. 35 history 
On November 18, 2021, Joey Gase would announce that with cars bought from defunct team H2 Motorsports and owned five cars, Gase would race for his team, Joey Gase Racing in 2022, with Gase driving the No. 35 for "most" of the season.

On December 30, 2021, it was announced that Patrick Emerling would join the team to be a co-owner. The team was renamed to the now-current name Emerling-Gase Motorsports, and that Patrick Emerling and Shane Lee would also share the ride with Gase. The team would also receive Our Motorsports' No. 23 owner's points from the 2021 season. Jeffrey Earnhardt would drive the No. 35 car at spring race at Phoenix and September Las Vegas race. Parker Kligerman would drive the 35 car at Circuit of the Americas and Indy Road Course. Chris Dyson would drive the car at Road America. Brad Perez drove the 35 car at Watkins Glen and Charlotte Roval. Dawson Cram drove the 35 car at Darlington.

In 2023, C. J. McLaughlin drove the No. 35 car at Daytona.

Car No. 35 results

Car No. 53 history 
Along with the December 30 announcement, the team would announce that the team would now field a part-time No. 53 entry. The team has ran the No. 53 twice in 2022 at Daytona and Talladega with Joey Gase and Shane Lee respectively. The No. 53 is scheduled to run full-time in 2023.

In 2023, Gase returned to the No. 53 car at Daytona.

Car No. 53 results

ARCA Menards Series

Car No. 53 history 
In 2023, EGR fielded the No. 53 Ford Fusion part-time for Natalie Decker in the ARCA Menards Series.

References

External links 
 

American auto racing teams
NASCAR teams